Sobhhï is a Dubai-based R&B artist. He has been ranked the number one streamed R&B artist in the UAE, and one of the top artists coming out of the Middle East. Beginning his career in computational mathematics, he now creates music full-time in the US and Dubai.

So far a non-performing artist, with plans to tour after 2020, Sobhhï's identity is so far largely unknown, although he has revealed the name Sobhhï is his grandfather's name, and is part of his own name, meaning "morning" in Arabic. His musical output has been categorised variously as music for late nights, or Nocturnal Trapsoul – 'dreamy R&B, bedroom soul and hip-hop'.

Career 
Sobhhï was born in the US and lived in multiple locations growing up, including Dubai, California and Louisiana. Taking night classes he graduated high school early and went to college at 16, beginning by studying economics- pursuing a master's degree in Chicago at the age of 21- before returning to Berkeley where he researched machine learning and artificial intelligence in pursuit of a PhD in computational mathematics.

In 2017 he decided to pause his PhD research and instead pursue a career in music-  another focus for him from an early age. He began his musical career with a collection of dark R&B tracks, going on to describe the evolution of his musical sound: "There was something I felt was absent in other music, [...] collecting these parts and amalgamating them is what eventually resulted in 'my sound'". He currently moves between the US and the Middle East.

A multi-faceted artist, in addition to writing lyrics and producing the instrumentals, Sobhhï also mixes and sometimes masters his own tracks, as well as directing and shooting his own videos. He has cited the album Nostalgia, Ultra by Frank Ocean as his most formative musical influence, and has also mentioned being influenced by, among others, Tribe Called Quest, James Fauntleroy, Drake, Jeremih, Joaoa Gilberto, and Amr Diab. Retaining the majority of the responsibility for the complete creation process has given his music a distinct sound, previously described as both mysterious and euphoric. In 2019 he founded his own record label and streetwear brand called NUIT SANS FIN, meaning “night without end” in French.

Beginning in 2017, Sobhhï started creating and releasing his color-themed EP series, which includes RED, BLACK, and the forthcoming PURPLE and WHITE. He describes the need for categorizing by color, rather than genre: "The whole color concept comes from the fact that I feel genres are too coarse and limiting to categorize music. You might listen to alternative rock followed by some techno followed by a rap song when you’re feeling motivated or in the gym. Clearly the genres don’t necessarily line up with how we feel, which to me, is the most important aspect of music."

Sobhhï has released three installments of the RED series, categorizing RED as a melancholic and vulnerable, alternative R&B, sound.  He describes the first three RED EPs as equating to a (now complete) chapter in his personal life, where he understands the music to have evolved alongside changes in his own perspectives.

In addition to the RED series, Sobhhï has begun releasing a series of BLACK EP's- the first of which, BLACK I, was released in 2019. Sobhhï plans the BLACK series to be a counterpart to RED, with a raw Trap-soul sound, produced entirely by Sobhhï and mastered by Mike Bozzi.

In late 2020 Sobhhï plans to release Pleasures, a collaborative EP.

Discography 

EPs
 Red I (November 2017)
 Red II (March 2018)
 Black I (February 2019)
 Luxury Casual (with Nivo) (December 2019)
 Red III (March 2020)
 Pleasures (November 2020)
 Luxury Casual II (with Nivo and NHYN) (July 2022)

References

External links 
 Sobhhï artist page on Spotify
 NUIT SANS FIN record label web page

Living people
Contemporary R&B singers
Trap musicians
Trap musicians (EDM)
Emirati rappers
Year of birth missing (living people)